Family Tree Media is a South African independent record label established in 2014 by Cassper Nyovest who currently operates as the CEO.

Departures

Tshego
On 22 March 2019, Cassper confirmed the departure of Tshego, from Family Tree, on a tweet, with a fan; Cassper tweeted "Tshego left the label almost a year ago". On 6 December 2020, Tshego slammed Cassper, and dragged him out on twitter for using his music under Family Tree without paying him. In the tweet, he also wrote "Been fighting a very silent legal battle, and when I win this case on Monday the humble shit stops". On 10 December 2020, Tshego won court case against Cassper Nyovest and Family Tree Records.

Artists

Current acts

Former acts

Discography

Studio albums

References

South African independent record labels
Record labels established in 2014
Hip hop record labels
2014 establishments in South Africa
Companies based in Johannesburg
Culture of Johannesburg